Cecelia is a variation of the given name Cecilia. People with the name include:

Cecelia Adkins (1923–2007, African-American publisher
Cecelia Ager (1902–1981), American film critic and reporter
Cecelia Ahern (born 1981) is an Irish novelist 
Cecelia Akagu (fl. 2010s–2020s), Nigerian Army brigadier general
Cecelia Antoinette (1949–2020), American actress, comedian, and writer
Cecelia Ayanori Bukari-Yakubu (fl. 1960s), Ghanaian politician
Cecelia Svinth Carpenter (1924–2010), first historian to write in detail about the Nisqually people
Cecelia Condit (born 1947), American video artist
Cecelia Cortes (born 1989), American professional squash player
Cecelia Felgueras (born 1962), Argentine politician
Cecelia Frey (born 1936), Canadian poet, novelist, and short story writer
Cecelia Lee Fung-Sing (born 1933), Chinese actress and Cantonese opera singer from Hong Kong
Cecelia Goetz (1917–2004), American lawyer and bankruptcy judge 
Cecelia González (fl. 2020s), American politician serving in the Nevada Assembly
Cecelia Hall (fl. 1970s–2010s), American sound designer and sound editor
Cecelia Holland (born 1943), American historical fiction novelist
Cecelia Joyce (born 1983), Irish cricketer
Cecelia Kenyon (1923–1990), American political scientist
Cecelia Pedescleaux (born 1945), African-American quilter of traditional and art quilts
Cecelia Cabaniss Saunders (1879–1966), African-American civil rights leader
Cecelia Tichi (born 1942), American academic and author of mystery novels
Cecelia Watson (fl. 2010s–2020s), American author and historian
Cecelia Wolstenholme (1915–1968), English competitive swimmer